Ernest Wardle (13 June 1930 – March 2013) was an English professional footballer who played as a full back in the Football League for York City, in non-League football for Billingham Synthonia and Billingham North End and was on the books of Middlesbrough without making a league appearance.

References

1930 births
2003 deaths
Footballers from Stockton-on-Tees
Footballers from County Durham
English footballers
Association football fullbacks
Billingham Synthonia F.C. players
Middlesbrough F.C. players
York City F.C. players
English Football League players